The 2011 Bergen International Film Festival is arranged in Bergen, Norway 19–26 October 2011, and was the 12th edition of the festival. It features over 175 feature films and documentaries, a new record for the festival. For the first time the festival arranges a competition program for Norwegian documentaries, as BIFF tries to establish itself as the leading arena for the documentary genre in Norway.

Films in competition

Cinema Extraordinare – In competition
 Above Us Only Sky, directed by Jan Schomburg  
 Arriya – The Stone, directed by Alberto Gorritiberea 
 Beduin, directed by Igor Voloshin  
 Confessions, directed by Tetsuya Nakashima  
 Declaration of War, directed by Valérie Donzelli  
 Even the Rain, directed by Icíar Bollaín  
 Las Acacias, directed by Pablo Giorgelli 
 Meek's Cutoff, directed by Kelly Reichardt USA
 Natural Selection, directed by Robbie Pickering USA
 Sleeping Beauty, directed by Julia Leigh  
 The Prize, directed by Paula Markovitch 
 Twilight Portrait, directed by Angelina Nikonova  
 Womb, directed by Benedek Fliegauf

International Documentaries – In competition
 The Black Power Mixtape 1967–1975, directed by Göran Hugo Olsson 
 Bombay Beach, directed by Alma Har'el USA
 Buck, directed by Cindy Meehl USA
 Chasing Madoff, directed by Jeff Prosserman USA
 Cinema Komunisto, directed by Mila Turajlic  
 A Man's Story, directed by Varon Bonicos 
 Koran by Heart, directed by Greg Barker USA
 Hot Coffee, directed by Susan Saladoff USA
 Something Ventured, directed by Dayna Goldfine and Dan Geller USA
 The Two Escobars, directed by Michael and Jeff Zimbalist USA
 Vodka Factory, directed by Jerzy Sladkowski

Checkpoints – In competition
 If a Tree Falls: A Story of the Earth Liberation Front, directed by Marshall Curry USA
 The Last Mountain, directed by Bill Haney USA
 The Interrupters, directed by Steve James USA
 The Oath, directed by Laura Poitras USA

Norwegian Documentaries – In competition
 The Afghan Nightmare, directed by Klaus Erik Okstad
 Death in Camp Delta, directed by Erling Borgen
 Folk ved Fjorden, directed by Øyvind Sandberg
 Ragnhild's Story, directed by Siren Henschien
 Imagining Emmanuel, directed by Thomas Østbye
 In God We Trust, directed by Astrid Schau-Larsen
 Urban Hunters, directed by Sturla Pilskog & Sidse Larsen
 The Doctors' War, directed by Elsa Kvamme
 My Beloved, directed by Hilde Korsæth
 Personal Velocity, directed by Jon Vatne
 Salesman 329, directed by Kari Anne Moe
 Snapshots, directed by Anniken Hoel

Norwegian Short Film Competition
 Alt faller sammen, directed by Andrew Amorim
 Asyl, directed by Jørn Utkilen
 Erkjenning, directed by Jøran Wærdahl
 Everything Will Be OK, directed by Jonas Matzow Guldbrandsen
 Farukhs mynt, directed by Susanne Falkum Løvik
 From This Day to Where, directed by Matias Rygh & Mathias Eriksen
 No Sex Just Understand, directed by Mariken Halle

Scandinavias Best Music Video
This year the five videoes from the respective three countries was nominated by NRK P3 in Norway, SVT in Sweden and the magazine Soundvenue in Denmark.

 Young Dreams – "Young Dreams", directed by Kristoffer Borgli  
 Torgny – "I Came Here", directed by Emil Trier  
 Karl X Johan – "Flames", directed by Gustav Johansson

External links
Official site

Bergen International Film Festival, 2010
Bergen International Film Festival
Bergen International Film Festival
Bergen International Film Festival